Poggiolini may refer to:
Carla Mazzuca Poggiolini, Italian journalist and politician
 Danilo Poggiolini, Italian physician and politician
 Duilio Poggiolini, Italian fraudster